Stian Grimseth (born 24 July 1972) is a weightlifter from Naustdal in Norway. He won the European Championship in 1996 and at some time held the 6th position in the world ranking.

He competed twice in the Olympics (1996 and 2004), World Cup, European Cup, and in Norway. During the Sydney Olympic games in 2000, Grimseth was suspended after failing a doping test. He served a 15 month period of ineligibility for testing positive for nandrolone.

Grimseth won his last Norwegian championships in March 2008, before retiring.

Grimseth is an active member of the Conservative Party.

References

Results

External links
 

1972 births
Living people
Conservative Party (Norway) politicians
Doping cases in weightlifting
Norwegian sportspeople in doping cases
Norwegian male weightlifters
Weightlifters at the 1996 Summer Olympics
Weightlifters at the 2004 Summer Olympics
People from Naustdal
Olympic weightlifters of Norway